The FPS Public Health, Food Chain Safety and Environment, more commonly known as the FPS Health, is a Federal Public Service of Belgium. Royal Order established FPS Justice on 23 May 2001, as part of Verhofstadt I Government to rebuild the federal administration.

It is responsible for guaranteeing the public health, the safety of the food chain and a safe environment.

Organisation
The FPS Health is currently organised into three Directorates-General and an Administration:
The Directorate-General for Health Care
The Directorate-General for Animals, Plants and Foodstuffs
The Directorate-General for Environment
The Administration of Medical Expertise (Medex)

The former Directorate-General for Medicinal Products has become the autonomous Federal Agency for Medicines and Health Products in 2007. The Directorate-General for Health Care is the result of the merger of the Directorate-General for Health Care Facilities Organisation and the Directorate-General for Primary Health Care & Crisis Management. The FPS Health is also linked with two scientific institutions:

Sciensano, the successor to the former Center for Veterinary and Agrochemical Research and the former Scientific Institute of Public Health
The Superior Health Council

See also
National Institute for Health and Disability Insurance

References

External links

Health
Belgium
Belgium
Ministries established in 2001
2001 establishments in Belgium
Food safety organizations
Regulation in Belgium